= Type 85 (military uniforms) =

Chinese People's Liberation Army uniform

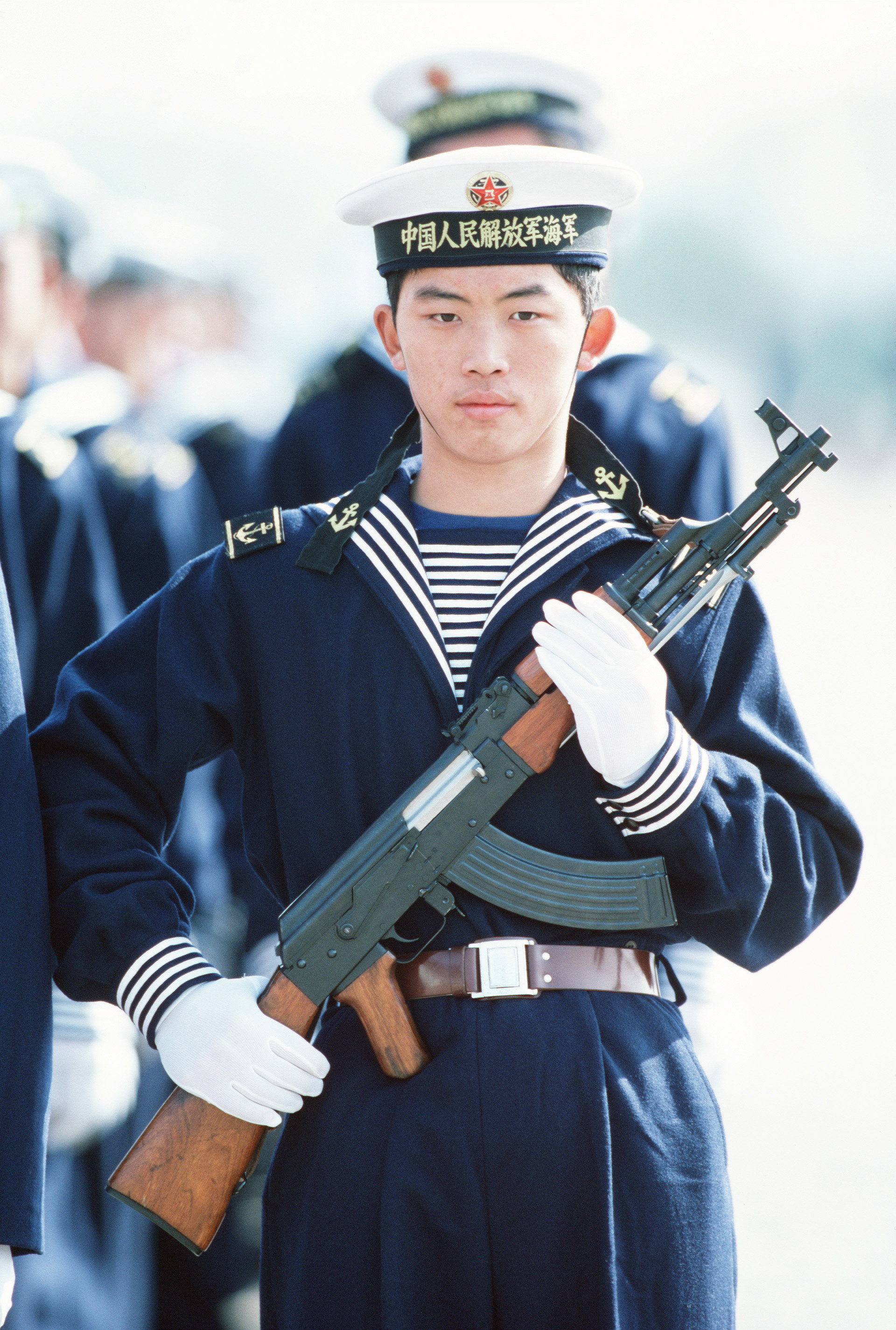
Chinese People's Liberation Army naval soldiers wearing Type 85 sailors' uniforms

Type 85 uniform (Chinese: 中国人民解放军85式军服) of the Chinese People's Liberation Army is a military uniform that the PLA began to equip in 1985. It is the third generation of PLA uniforms and is called the Type 85 uniform because it was officially adopted in 1985.

== Overview ==
Starting in 1981, the People's Liberation Army began designing a new system of uniforms. Since the uniform change was initially to be accompanied by the restoration of the rank system, the Type 85 uniform was initially designed as a "rank uniform". In 1985, due to the reorganization and streamlining of the People's Liberation Army, the Central Military Commission decided to postpone the restoration of the rank system to 1988. The planned uniform change proceeded as scheduled, but the rank insignia were not worn for the time being. However, the names of the uniforms were still based on the original rank uniform names, such as "general officer peaked cap", "field officer summer uniform", and "company officer winter uniform". On May 1, 1985, the Type 85 uniform was officially issued to the troops. The Type 85 uniform basically followed the style of the Type 55 uniform, with only some differences in details, and only regular uniforms were provided, not dress uniforms.

== Clothing ==
=== Service Uniform ===
==== Officer Service Uniform ====
The officer service uniform jacket features a stand-up collar (smaller collar for female officers), gold buttons, and loose-fitting trousers with two unbuttoned pockets. Officers are distinguished by rank and color and fabric: Army and Air Force officers at the regimental level and above wear brownish-green uniforms, while officers below regimental level wear grass green (Air Force trousers are navy blue). Navy officers wear navy blue in winter and white in summer.

==== Officer Shirt ====
The Type 85 uniform introduced shirts with military insignia for the first time. Both long-sleeved and short-sleeved versions were available; the short-sleeved version was for summer wear. Army and Air Force shirts were brownish-yellow, while Navy shirts were white.

==== Officer Overcoat ====
The Type 85 uniform overcoat also followed the style of the Type 55, featuring a double-breasted design with a small stand-up collar. Army and Air Force overcoats were brownish-green, while Navy overcoats were navy blue.

=== Soldiers' uniforms ===
Soldiers' uniforms featured stand-up collars (female soldiers wore small collars), naval shore-based soldiers wore stand-up collars, and shipboard soldiers wore sailor uniforms. The lower garments were loose-fitting trousers with brown buttons, and the upper garment had two buttoned pockets on the chest. The army and air force uniforms were grass green, while the navy uniforms were navy blue in winter and white in summer.

=== Clothing fabrics ===
Summer uniforms for officers above the regimental level were made of valet wool, winter uniforms of riding breeches were made of cavalry wool, and overcoats of overcoat wool. Officers above the corps level wore pure wool, division and regimental officers wore wool-polyester blends, and officers below the battalion level and combat uniforms wore polyester-nylon-cotton blends.

=== Military caps ===
The Type 85 revived the use of peaked caps. The difference from the Type 55 was that the cap badge was moved from the cap band to the brim. Peaked caps were divided into officer peaked caps and soldier peaked caps. Officers' peaked caps have a brownish-green brim, a red band, and rayon-woven cap bands. Generals' caps are gold-yellow, while those of field and company officers are silver-gray. Naval officers' peaked caps have a navy blue brim in winter and white in summer, with a black band and rayon-woven cap bands. Generals' caps are gold-yellow, while those of field and company officers are silver-gray. Air Force officers' cap brims are the same color as Army caps, but the bands are blue. Enlisted personnel, except for naval ship sailors who are issued additional sailor caps, generally have peaked caps of similar color to officers (Army and Air Force caps have no bands, while Navy cap bands are black), the difference being that the cap bands are made of black synthetic leather. Additionally, a fleece-lined cap is issued in winter.

=== Training Uniforms ===
==== Type 85 Training Uniforms ====
Type 85 military uniforms were the first type of uniforms issued for training purposes. However, the officers' training uniforms were modified from the Type 65 military uniforms with cap badges and collar insignia, while soldiers used both regular and training uniforms.

==== Camouflage Uniforms ====
Type 81 camouflage uniforms were the first camouflage uniforms issued to the Chinese People's Liberation Army. They were developed based on the combat experience of the Chinese People's Liberation Army in the Sino-Vietnamese War. The Type 81 camouflage uniforms adopted a double-sided camouflage design. The front camouflage was called "large five-leaf camouflage", while the back used duck hunting camouflage. The Type 81 camouflage uniforms specifically reinforced easily worn areas. The cuffs and hems of the trousers had drawstrings or elastic bands, which could be tightened when hiding in the jungle to prevent mosquitoes from entering. Further improvements were made in 1986, mainly focusing on the design and cut, and a face mask was added. This was because some frontline soldiers reported that there were many mosquitoes in southern Xinjiang, and mosquitoes would crawl onto their faces during the infiltration process. At the same time, due to the high temperature in southern Xinjiang, the face paint applied was easily washed off by sweat, which indirectly increased the risk of exposure.

=== Cap badges ===
The Type 85 cap badge basically followed the style of the Type 55 cap badge, but with modifications to the details.

=== Shoulder boards ===
Although the Type 85 military uniform was still a uniform without rank insignia, shoulder boards were still set up as a decoration to ensure that the cost of changing uniforms would be reduced when the rank system was restored in the future. The pattern of the Army shoulder boards was the August 1st Army emblem, the Navy added an anchor on this basis, and the Air Force added wings. And the colors were different according to the officer's rank.

=== Collar Insignia ===
The Type 85 armored vehicle was also issued with collar insignia, and the styles of the insignia differed between officers and enlisted personnel.
